Ephraim George Sills (April 18, 1836 – April 4, 1909) was an Ontario businessman and political figure. He represented Hastings West in the Legislative Assembly of Ontario from 1883 to 1886 as a Liberal member.

He was born in Fredericksburgh Township, Lennox County and educated in Picton. With his brother, Sills owned a sawmill, gristmill and paper mill in Frankford. In 1876, he married Sarah Crichton Muir. He served as reeve for Sidney Township. Sills was an unsuccessful candidate for Hastings West in the 1886 general election. He died in 1909.

References

External links
The Canadian parliamentary companion, 1885 JA Gemmill

By Bridge and Mill : a history of the Village of Frankford, W Lewis & L Turner (1979) 

1836 births
1909 deaths
Ontario Liberal Party MPPs
People from Lennox and Addington County
People from Quinte West